The parish of Algalah is an Australian cadastral parish in the NSW county of Narromine.

The area is predominantly agricultural and significant geographic features include the Bogan River and Bullock Tank Swamp.
 
The parish is named for the Algalah Run Sheep station that occupied the majority of the parish, and which was founded by Robert John Walker who is reputed to have moved a World Record Wagon load of wool to the local railway station with a single Shire stallion. 
Walkers' business partner Andrew Taylor Kerr founded "Deribong run" after which the neighbouring parish of Deribong is named.

Gallery

References 

Parishes of Narromine County